The Hermanspann Chinook is an American mid-wing, two-seat, experimental research glider that was designed and constructed by Fred Hermanspann and Art Penz.

Design and development
The Chinook and its improved variant, the Chinook S, have been used to study the effect of rain on airfoils and  also stall dynamics.

The aircraft is predominantly made from aluminium with the cockpit area made from fiberglass. Its  span high aspect ratio wing employs a Wortmann FX67-K-170/17 airfoil. Glidepath control is via hydraulically operated trailing edge flaps that deflect 80°. The landing gear consists of hydraulically retractable nose gear and main gear. The vertical stabilizer is highly swept.

The improved Chinook S features an improved wing tip design, system and structure refinements and a BRS-1200 ballistic parachute.

Only one Chinook was constructed and it was registered with the US Federal Aviation Administration in the Experimental - Amateur-built category.

Operational history
In March 2015 the Chinook was still registered with the FAA to Hermanspann.

After the conclusion of a number of research projects including about rain effects, performance measurements and stall dynamics, the sailplane was being employed extensively through 2015 for cross-country flying, having made a total of five crossings of the Cacscade mountains and having set four Washington state soaring records.

Variants
Chinook
Original configuration, first flown in 1993.
Chinook S
Improved configuration, first flown in 1996.

Specifications (Chinook S)

See also

References

1990s United States sailplanes
Homebuilt aircraft
Aircraft first flown in 1993
Mid-wing aircraft
Glider aircraft